Deben Estuary is a  biological Site of Special Scientific Interest (SSSI) covering the River Deben and its banks  from its mouth north of Felixstowe to Woodbridge in Suffolk. It is a Ramsar internationally important wetland site and a Special Protection Area under the European Union Directive on the Conservation of Wild Birds. It is also in the Suffolk Coast and Heaths Area of Outstanding Natural Beauty. It partly overlaps two geological SSSIs, Ferry Cliff, Sutton and Ramsholt Cliff.

The site has been designated an SSSI for its overwintering waders and wildfowl, and for its diverse saltmarshes. It has internationally important overwintering redshanks and nationally important numbers of dark-bellied brent geese, shelducks and black-tailed godwits. The estuary also has three nationally rare plants and a nationally rare mollusc.

References

External links

Sites of Special Scientific Interest in Suffolk
Special Areas of Conservation in England
Ramsar sites in England